Eleven ships and a shore establishment of the Royal Navy have borne the name HMS Cormorant, after the seabird, the cormorant:

 was a 16-gun fireship, previously the French Marchault. She was captured in 1757 and sold in 1762.
 was a 14-gun sloop launched in 1776. She may have been at the Siege of Pondicherry (1778). The French captured her in 1781 off Charleston, South Carolina and took her into service as Cormoran. She apparently accompanied Admiral de Grasse's fleet to the Chesapeake, however, her subsequent fate is unknown.
 was a 12-gun brig-sloop, previously the American Rattlesnake. She was captured in 1781, renamed HMS Rattlesnake in 1783, and sold in 1786.
 was an 18-gun  ship-sloop launched in 1794 and destroyed by an accidental explosion in 1796.
She was captured in 1796 and wrecked in 1800.
 was a 16-gun sloop, formerly the civilian Blenheim. She was purchased in 1804, converted to a storeship in 1808 and sold in 1817. She then returned to mercantile service as a West Indiaman under the name Blenheim. She was last seen on 10 November 1821.
 was a paddlewheel sloop launched in 1842 and broken up in 1853.
 was a screw gunvessel launched in 1856 and sunk in 1859.
 was a screw sloop launched in 1860 and sold in 1870.
 was an  composite screw sloop launched in 1877, reduced to harbour service in 1889, renamed HMS Rooke in 1946, and broken up in 1949.
 was a patrol boat launched in 1975 as HMAFV Sunderland for the Royal Air Force. She was transferred to the Royal Navy in 1985 and was sold in 1991.

Shore establishment
 was the Royal Naval Air Station at Gibraltar between 1943 and 1944.

Other ships
Cormorant built 1865 was an Iron Barque 1073 gross tons. Builder T. Vernon and Sons. Liverpool. Owners W. J. Myers, Sons and Co. Reg. Liverpool. Sold c.1890 to Norwegian owners without change of name. Converted to a 3 mast barque, 1091 gross tons.
Cormorant 1883 an iron single screw Schooner. Construction: 1853, E. Pike in Cork. Owners: City of Cork Steam Packet Co. Ltd.
Cormorant II was a trawler hired between 1915 and 1919.
Cormorant III was a drifter hired between 1915 and 1919.
Cormorant IV was a trawler hired between 1916 and 1919.
 Q.G.S. Cormorant 1900–1955, a Queensland, Australia, Pilot boat, based in Brisbane.
 P677 Cormoran 1995 - a Flamant class patrol vessel of the French Navy

Citations

References

Demerliac, Alain (1996) La Marine De Louis XVI: Nomenclature Des Navires Français De 1774 À 1792. (Nice: Éditions OMEGA). 

Royal Navy ship names